On 21 October 2016, Skol Airlines Flight 9375 crashed in Yamalo-Nenets on the Yamal Peninsula in Siberia, Russia. At least nineteen people were killed and there were three survivors. The helicopter was carrying at least 22 passengers and crew, mostly oil and gas workers.

Incident
A Mil Mi-8 helicopter was on its way to the Suzumskoye oil and gas field in Staryi Urengoi, Yamalo-Nenets from the Vankor in the Krasnoyarsk region, and was carrying mostly oil and gas workers. It fell on its side, and victims could not get out. There were three survivors, all passengers. All of the three crew were killed. There were conflicting news reports, some stating that at least 19 people died, and some stating that 21 people were killed.

Aftermath
Russian President Vladimir Putin expressed his condolences to the relatives of the deceased, and Yamalo-Nenets Governor Dmitry Kobylkin announced a full day of mourning and ordered that flags be flown at half-mast while cancelling entertainment events.
On August 24 2017, the Interstate Aviation Committee released the final report concluding that:
Fatal accident with Mi-8Т RA-22869 helicopter was caused by flight crew spatial disorientation while attempting to perform emergency landing in night time conditions at  overcast sky and lack of light reference points at the location of landing.  The low quantity of fuel was the reason for emergency landing to be performed.

See also
 List of accidents and incidents involving helicopters
 2016 Russian Ministry of Emergency Situations Irkutsk Il-76 crash
 2013 Siberia Polar Airlines Mil Mi-8 crash

References

2016 disasters in Russia
Accidents and incidents involving the Mil Mi-8
Aviation accidents and incidents in 2016
Aviation accidents and incidents in Russia
October 2016 events in Russia
Transport in Yamalo-Nenets Autonomous Okrug